Can't Forget You may refer to:

 "Can't Forget You" (Gloria Estefan song), 1991
 "Can't Forget You" (Sonia song), 1989